An automotive part retailer is a retail business that sells automotive parts and related accessories to both consumers and professional repair shops, through physical stores and websites. Some automotive parts retailers also offer customer support and services related to automotive maintenance and repair.

The sector is often dependent on consumers' disposable income, and therefore affected by business cycles and economic conditions.

History 
The automotive parts industry in the United States began with the proliferation of automobiles as a common method of transportation. As the industry grew, small businesses came to be replaced by chains and retail networks. General Motors was the first company in the industry to begin franchising in 1893. In 1909, Western Auto became the first retailer of aftermarket automotive parts in the United States. In 1928, Genuine Parts Company as a distributor of automotive replacement parts, industrial parts and consumer supplies. Its largest component is NAPA Auto Parts.

By the 1970s, large companies like Advance Auto Parts, AutoZone and O'Reilly Auto Parts dominated the market. Most of these also offered private label automotive products, which accounted over 50% of revenue in some cases.

Demand for automotive parts correlates with the average age of vehicles on the road, and the price of fuel. When newer cars are more expensive or there are supply chain issues, consumers are more likely to keep and repair their existing cars, or purchase older used cars that require more regular repairs. The average age of vehicles in the United States increased from the 6.5 years in 1980, to 8.5 years in 2000.

2020 to present 
Demand for auto parts can be affected by how much consumers travel for work, education and travel. During the COVID-19 pandemic, sales dropped rapidly, as did the stock price growth of many major US retailers during 2020. The subsequent increase in road travel had the opposite effect; unlike home improvement, furniture or grocery retailers, automotive parts retailers directly benefited from incremental increases in the number of consumers commuting to work or school.

Major American retailers recorded high revenue, sales figures or operating margins in 2021 as a result of this trend, despite experiencing high inflation and supply chain pressures.

The average age of a vehicle in the US reached a record high of 12.1 years in 2021. The price of gas rose sharply in 2022, causing volatility for the sector.

By market

United States

Automotive part retailing is a $300 billion industry in the United States.

O'Reilly Auto Parts, Advance Auto Parts, CarMax and AutoZone are major players in the industry.

Other retailers include:

 Allen Tire Company
 American Tire Distributors
 AmericanMuscle
 Amsoil
 Auto Parts Warehouse
 Belle Tire
 Big O Tires
 CarParts.com
 Carquest
 Chief Auto Parts
 Commercial Tire
 CSK Auto
 Discount Tire
 G.I. Joe's
 Grand Auto Supply
 Grigsby-Grunow
 JC Whitney
 Jegs High Performance
 KOI Auto Parts
 Les Schwab Tire Centers
 LKQ Corporation
 McQuay-Norris
 NAPA Auto Parts
 Oscaro
 Pep Boys
 Pfadt Race Engineering
 Quirk Tires and Service
 RevZilla.com
 Rovers North
 Summit Racing Equipment
 Super Shops
 Tire Discounters
 Tire Kingdom
 Tire Rack
 Trak Auto
 Valvoline Instant Oil Change
 VIP Tires and Service
 Western Auto
 Winston Tire Company

Canada

Canada's automotive part retailers include Amsoil, Fountain Tire, Integra Tire & Auto Centres, PartSource and Tirecraft.

United Kingdom

Halfords is a major retailer in the United Kingdom, and owns National Tyres and Autocare and Ripspeed.

Demon Tweeks also operates in the UK market.

Europe

Several retailers operate in multiple European countries, including Euro Car Parts, Motrio, Nipparts, Autodoc and Oscaro. The Asian retailer Autobacs Seven also has stores in France.

Australia and New Zealand

Repco and Supercheap Auto are major rivals in the Australian and New Zealand markets, targeting both consumers and trade customers.

Autobarn is a smaller competitor, but outranked the major rivals for consumer satisfaction in Australia in 2018.

Ultra Tune also has stores around Australia.

Asia

Autobacs Seven operates in Asia, and also has stores in France.

References

See also

 Automobile repair shop
 Automobile dealer

Retailers by type of merchandise sold